Keith Miller (born 14 February 1953) is a former Australian rules footballer who played with Geelong in the Victorian Football League (VFL).

Geelong
Miller, a ruckman from Echuca, was at Geelong for one season, in 1974. On his league debut, in the opening round of the season against Footscray, Miller came on as a reserve in the last quarter. His only other appearance came in round three, when Geelong beat Melbourne at the MCG. Miller started the game on this occasion.

Country football
He returned to Echuca in 1975, then spent two seasons with Turvey Park, a Wagga Wagga-based club in the South Western District Football League (SWDFL). In 1977 he was runner-up in the SWDFL's Gammage Medal and played in Turvey Park's premiership team, as an assistant coach.

ACTAFL
In 1978, Miller became captain-coach of ACT Australian Football League club Eastlake, which he led to a premiership in his first season, with a grand final win over Kevin Neale's Ainslie. The following year he won a Mulrooney Medal as well as the first of three successive club best and fairest awards. He spent the 1980 season as a player only, then at the end of the year was appointed coach of Belconnen. Before the 1981 season began, Miller resigned as coach and returned to Eastlake. He won a second Mulrooney Medal in 1981 and was an Alex Jesaulenko Medalist in 1982 for his performance in Eastlake's grand final loss to Ainslie. Returning as coach in 1985, it would be his last season playing for the club. His final year at Eastlake in 1986 was as a non playing coach.

References

External links

1953 births
Australian rules footballers from Victoria (Australia)
Geelong Football Club players
Echuca Football Club players
Eastlake Football Club players
Living people